Surjit Saha is an Indian actor model & social media Influencer. Saha was born in Kolkata and is Bengali by origin. He is best known for playing the character AgentQ in Badi Door Se Aaye Hai on SAB TV.

Career 

Saha started his career as a fashion stylist and later took up modelling and acting as his profession. Saha has done several print shoots for newspapers like The Telegraph (Calcutta) and Sakalbela. He was first seen on a show called Chidiya Ghar on SAB TV. He played a cameo in the show as Rajveer. Soon after he was called for the show Badi Door Se Aaye Hai for the same channel. Saha has also done a show for Colors TV called Thapki Pyar Ki. Saha has been finalized to play the lead in a Pakistani show named Hum Dono most likely to start from September 2016. This is Saha's first international project.

In 2022, he portrayed Bunty Chaudhary in StarPlus' show Rajjo.

Modeling 

Saha has been part of few commercial ads like Bajaj Allianz General Insurance and digital media modelling for MTV style check. Saha has also been an integral part of Rise 2017 a calendar spreading awareness for Parkinson's disease and raising donations for Hrishikesh's Centre of Contemporary Dance curing the people affected by Parkinson's disease.

Personal life 
Saha was born and brought up in Kolkata and has done his schooling from St. Mary's Orphanage & Day School, Kolkata. He is the youngest of the two siblings.

Known Relatives 
Radhu Karmakar who was a well known cinematographer and director in Bollywood

Television

References

External links 
 
 

Living people
Indian male film actors
Indian male television actors
Male actors from Kolkata
Male actors in Hindi television
Year of birth missing (living people)